P80 may refer to:

Automobiles 
 BMW P80, a family of Formula One engines
 Toyota Starlet (P80), a Japanese car
 Volvo P80 platform, a Swedish mid-size automobile platform
 WM P80, a French prototype racing car

Other vehicles 
 P80 (rocket stage), a rocket engine
 , a corvette of the Indian Navy
 Lockheed P-80 Shooting Star, an American jet fighter
 Pottier P.80, a French sport aircraft

Other uses 
 Nikon Coolpix P80, a digital camera
 P80, a national road of Latvia
 Pestivirus NS3 polyprotein peptidase, an enzyme
 p80, a subunit of the protein Katanin

See also 
 Pistole 80, a military designation for the Glock pistol
 Polymer80, an American firearms manufacturer